Circle of Scorpions is the 196th novel in the long-running Nick Carter-Killmaster series.

Publishing history
The book was first published in 1985.

Plot summary
Nick Carter knows that the KGB has called a meeting of all the world's terrorist organizations. It's a party he wants to crash: the only problem is, he doesn't know where or when. But espionage has its own deadly etiquette, and with the help of a beautiful double agent and a black market death-merchant, N3 proves that there are ways to get invited to even the most exclusive affairs...

Main characters
Nick Carter, agent N-3, AXE
Hawk, Carter’s boss, head of AXE
Naomi Bartinelli, money launderer and arms broker
Al Garret, AXE electronics expert
Ali Maumed Kashmir, Lebanese arms dealer
Carlotta Polti, Italian CID agent working undercover in the La Aicizia di Liberta    Italiana terrorist group.
Hadley, Chris, Barzoni, Hal, Ted, and Marco, AXE strike team members
Oakhurst code name for an Amsterdam arms dealer
Tony Santoni, Italian CID
Sophia Palmori, Liberta terrorist member
Wombo, Pocky and Nordo Compari, Liberta terrorist members
Pietro Amani, jailed leader of Liberta
Jason Henry, American mercenary pilot

1985 novels
Nick Carter-Killmaster novels